Sindhu Sajan is a school teacher, social activist and a theater activist who actively devotes herself to the educational and cultural upliftment of tribal children in Attappadi. She directed a documentary titled Aggedu Nayaga (Mathrumozhi) , addressing the linguistic and cultural issues of the tribal community in Attappadi. The film was screened in short films competition section of the International Documentary and Short Film Festival Kerala 2015 (IDSFFK 2015) organized by Kerala State Film Academy, Also this film screened at the International Children’s Film Festival of Kerala 2018 (ICFFK 2018) organized by the Kerala State Council for Child Welfare, and screened in the MIFF prism non competition short films section of the Mumbai International Film Festival 2016, and at the All Lights India International Film Festival 2018.
Fowzia Fathima, the cinematographer of this film received the best Cinematographer Award of the Kerala State Television Awards 2015,
She has also written a book titled Thai Mozhi which addresses the language problem faced by Adivasi students of Attappadi of Palakkad District of Kerala State.

Notable work 
She directed a documentary titled "Aggedu Nayaga" (Mathrumozhi) addressing the linguistic and cultural issues of the tribal community in Attappadi. There are three types of tribes living in Attappadi, Irula people, Mudugar and Kurumbas and their languages are entire different from each other and from Malayalam the official language of Kerala State.

Personal life 
She is from Tirur, Malappuram District and currently living in Agali, Palakkad District and working as a teacher in Govt Vocational Higher Secondary School in Agali. Married to Sajan, an environmentalist, a painter, and animator. Sajan's animation film Pachilakkudu (My Home is Green) won the Golden Camera Award for Best Animated Film at the Nashik International Film Festival 2012, Her son Manav, who has won the  'Young bird watcher of the year ' award three times, given by Sálim Ali Centre for Ornithology and Natural History has been active in bird watching since the age of 8. Daughter Mithra is a student in the Agali government school.

References 

Living people
1972 births